Clemmons may refer to 
Clemmons, North Carolina, a village in the United States
W.C. Clemmons Mound, a Native American mound in Ohio, United States
Clemmons Educational State Forest in North Carolina, United States
Clemmons (surname)

See also
Clemons (disambiguation)
Clemens (disambiguation)